Woodrow Methodist Church is a historic Methodist church at 1109 Woodrow Road in Woodrow, Staten Island, New York.  It was built in 1842 and is a wood-frame, clapboard-sided, temple-form Greek Revival style building.  It features a portico with four Doric order columns supporting a plain entablature and unadorned pediment. Above the portico is a three-stage, open bell tower and spire in a vernacular Italianate style added in 1876.  Also on the property is a two-story clapboard house built about 1850 and expanded in 1860–61.

It was added to the National Register of Historic Places in 1982.

See also
 National Register of Historic Places listings in Richmond County, New York
 List of New York City Designated Landmarks in Staten Island

References

Properties of religious function on the National Register of Historic Places in Staten Island
Italianate architecture in New York City
Greek Revival architecture in New York City
Greek Revival church buildings in New York City
Churches completed in 1842
19th-century Methodist church buildings in the United States
Churches in Staten Island
New York City Designated Landmarks in Staten Island
Methodist churches in New York City
1842 establishments in New York (state)
Woodrow, Staten Island
Italianate church buildings in the United States